Khabees ( sometimes pronounce as Khabeesa) is a traditional sweet dish from Arab States of the Persian Gulf, and common in Qatar, Bahrain, Kuwait, Oman, Saudi Arabia and the United Arab Emirates. It is made of flour and oil and is commonly served as a traditional dish for breakfast, especially during Eid days.

Etymology

Khabees خَبِيصْ (or more uncommonly, khabeesa خبيصة) from  The root خَبَصَ (“to mix”) is denominal.

History

A recipe for Khabees was mentioned in a 10th century Arabic cookbook, Kitab al-Ṭabīḫ (the book of dishes) by Ibn Sayyar al-Warraq.

Arab cuisine
Middle Eastern cuisine
Qatari cuisine
Bahraini cuisine
Emirati cuisine
Kuwaiti cuisine
Emirati desserts